Gregor Schlierenzauer (born 7 January 1990) is an Austrian former ski jumper who competed from 2006 to 2021. He is one of the most successful ski jumpers of all time, having won the Ski Jumping World Cup overall title, the Four Hills Tournament, and Nordic Tournament twice each; the Ski Flying World Cup overall title three times; as well as four medals at the Winter Olympics, twelve at the Ski Jumping World Championships, and five at the Ski Flying World Championships.

During his victorious 2008–09 World Cup season, Schlierenzauer set a number of ski jumping records, including surpassing Janne Ahonen's record of twelve individual World Cup wins in a season with thirteen; and also tying Ahonen, Matti Hautamäki, and Thomas Morgenstern's record of six consecutive individual wins in a single season. On 26 January 2013, Schlierenzauer equalled Matti Nykänen's long-standing record of 46 individual World Cup wins; he would go on to achieve a total of 53 wins, the most of any male ski jumper.

On 21 September 2021, he announced the end of his athletic career on his website.

Early and personal life
Gregor Schlierenzauer was born on 7 January 1990 in Innsbruck, Tyrol, to Paul and Angelika Schlierenzauer. The second of three children, he has an older sister, Gloria, and a younger brother, Lukas. His uncle is Markus Prock, the winner of three Winter Olympic medals in men's luge, who settled him a contract with Fischer Skis in 2001 and a few years later with Red Bull. Schlierenzauer has been deaf in his left ear since birth. He is also the cousin of luger Hannah Prock.

At age eight, Schlierenzauer began training in ski jumping at SV Innsbruck–Bergisel club. He attended an ordinary Austrian grammar school, however, due to tight schedules in both sport and school, he had problems keeping up with his class work. Schlierenzauer then enrolled at Skigymnasium Stams in Austria, the world's oldest ski-sport training center and boarding secondary school. He currently resides in Fulpmes, Tyrol.

Schlierenzauer began competing professionally in the 2005/06 season in the Continental Cup, then only fifteen years old. In February 2006, he won the gold medal at the Junior World Championships in Kranj, Slovenia and then Alex Pointner, the coach of the Austrian professional team, called him to compete in the World Cup. Schlierenzauer debuted in the World Cup finishing in 24th place at the Holmenkollen Ski Festival on 12 March 2006.

Ski jumping career

2006/07 World Cup
On 3 December 2006, Schlierenzauer took his first World Cup victory in Lillehammer, Norway, and became one of the youngest jumpers to ever win a world cup competition. He also won in Oberstdorf, Germany, at the Four Hills Tournament 2006/07. During the Four Hills Tournament, Finnish newspapers claimed that Schlierenzauer was extremely underweight, however, no evidence has ever been found to substantiate this accusation. He won the fourth competition, in Bischofshofen, Austria, on his 17th birthday, but finished the tournament in second place, behind Anders Jacobsen (Norway), and in front of Simon Ammann (Switzerland).

Schlierenzauer took fourth place in World Cup 2006/07. He was second, but Adam Małysz from Poland ended up taking the first-place position from Anders Jacobsen, so Schlierenzauer finished third. His coach deemed the event in Planica too demanding for 17-year-old Schlierenzauer, so he did not compete there and ended finishing fourth, behind Adam Małysz, Anders Jacobsen and Simon Ammann.

2007/08 World Cup
At the beginning of the World Cup 2007/08, Schlierenzauer took 2nd place on the World Cup list, behind his teammate Thomas Morgenstern. He also took 2nd place in Oberstdorf, Germany, during the Four Hills Tournament 2007/08. He won 1st place in Garmisch-Partenkirchen, Germany. He took 8th place at the competition in Bischofshofen which was originally to be held in Innsbruck but was moved due to strong winds. He was one of the favorites for the tournament, but, due to variable weather conditions, arrived only in 42nd position in the first series and did not enter the second series. At the end of the Four Hills Tournament, he ended up in 12th place.

He skipped the competitions in Predazzo, where Tom Hilde from Norway took his first World Cup victory, and in Harrachov. On 25 January 2008, Schlierenzauer took his second World Cup victory in Zakopane, Poland. He also skipped the competition in Sapporo, ruining his chance to take the first-place position from his Austrian teammate Thomas Morgenstern.

After two-second-place finishes in Liberec and an eighth-place finish in Willingen, he took part in the FIS Ski Flying World Championships in Oberstdorf in 2008. After four series of competing, he won the gold medal, on 23 February 2008. The next day, on 24 February, the Austrian team, composed of (Schlierenzauer-Thomas Morgenstern-Koch-Kofler) won gold in the team competition.

He also took part in the 2008 Nordic Tournament. He took the second and fourth place at the two competitions in Kuopio and in Lahti which was moved to Kuopio because of bad weather). Winning at the competitions in Lillehammer and Oslo, he won the 2008 Nordic Tournament.

After consecutively winning the last four individual competitions of the season, Schlierenzauer ranked second overall in the 2007/08 World Cup, 233 points behind his teammate Thomas Morgenstern. In March 2008, he improved the Austrian national record on flying hills to 233.5 meters, which was also the longest jump of Planica 2008 ski jumping events.

2008/09 World Cup
On 11 February 2009, Schlierenzauer became only the fourth jumper to win 6 consecutive World Cup events, tying the record held by Austrian teammate Thomas Morgenstern and Finns Janne Ahonen and Matti Hautamäki. The run of victories came to an end in Oberstdorf during the ski flying event on 14 February, when Schlierenzauer arrived in 8th position.

On 21 February he won silver in the individual normal hill event at the FIS Nordic World Ski Championships 2009 in Liberec behind fellow Austrian and Four Hills winner Wolfgang Loitzl. One week later, Schlierenzauer won gold in the team large hill event.

He returned to winning ways in individual competition on 8 March at Lahti, Finland, taking his number of wins to 11 for that season, one victory shy of Janne Ahonen's record of 12 wins in one season.

On 20 March he won the ski flying event at Planica, taking his number of wins to 13 for the season record, record of 20 podiums in a season and clinching the 2008/09 world cup title with two flying events left to run. He also achieved a record of 2083 points in the World Cup over a single season, becoming the first person to obtain more than 2000 points. The current records of wins, podiums and points in a single world cup season is held by Peter Prevc.

2009/10 World Cup

In the 2009/10 World Cup, Schlierenzauer finished second behind Simon Ammann. He celebrated 8 World Cup victories including wins in Garmisch-Partenkirchen and Innsbruck during the Four Hills Tournament. One of the season highlights for Schlierenzauer was the 2010 Winter Olympics in Vancouver. He was only 7th after the first round in the Normal Hill competition, but jumping 106.5 meters in the final round, moved him up to 3rd position. The Normal Hill event was won by Simon Ammann while Adam Malysz was second. A week later, Schlierenzauer was 5th after the first round in the Large Hill competition, but moved to 3rd place again in the final round. The competition was once again won by Simon Ammann while Adam Malysz finished second.

Two days later he won the Team Event with Wolfgang Loitzl, Andreas Kofler and Thomas Morgenstern, earning Schlierenzauer his first ever Olympic Gold Medal.

At the Ski Flying World Championships in Planica, he was beaten only by Simon Ammann and won silver. With the team he won the gold medal again.

2010/11 World Cup
At the beginning of the 2010/11 World Cup, Schlierenzauer suffered an injury and missed the first two events of the Four Hills Tournament. Even though he was recovering from injury, he managed to take two victories at the Vikersund ski flying hill and also set a new Personal Best in Vikersund by jumping 243.5 meters.
 
Later in the season, he won three gold medals at FIS Nordic World Ski Championships at Holmenkollen in Oslo. In the competition on the large hill, he won his first and only individual gold medal at the Nordic World Championships, only 0.3 points ahead of his teammate Thomas Morgenstern. 

With an victory in Planica at the end of the season, he was able to win the ski flying classification for the second time.

2011/12 World Cup
Schlierenzauer celebrated his first victory of the 2011/12 season in Harrachov on 9 December 2011. On 6 January 2012, Schlierenzauer won the Four Hills Tournament for the first time. 

On January 15, 2012, at the second ski flying competition on the Kulm, Schlierenzauer's jump suit tore just before his jump and could not be repaired, but Schlierenzauer still jumped to victory with a superior jump, but was disqualified due to the suit. This disqualification ultimately cost him the overall World Cup.

As of 5 February 2012, Schlierenzauer has 40 World Cup victories, overtaking Adam Malysz. At the end of the season he finished second in the overall World Cup, behind Norwegian Anders Bardal.

2012/13 World Cup
Schlierenzauer dominated the 2012/13 season, winning the Four Hills Tournament for the second time and the ski flying classification for the third time.

At the first Individual Competition in Vikersund, on the 26th January 2013, Schlierenzauer equaled Nykänen's long-standing record of 46 World Cup wins, and at Harrachov, on the 2nd February, he superseded Nykänen's record by winning again. 

At the Nordic Championchips in Val di Fiemme, Schlierenzauer won gold with the team, silver with the mixed-team and also silver on the normal hill.

At the end of the season he won the overall World Cup by a wide margin and at that point already had 50 World Cup wins.

2013/14 World Cup
The 2013/14 season initially went well for Schlierenzauer, and after not competing in Klingenthal he was able to win his first two competitions of the season in Kuusamo and Lillehammer. He finished 8th at the Four Hills Tournament and also took two podium finishes at the Kulm ski-flying events.

However, he could not build on his past dominance in the World Cup and so the Olympic Winter Games in Sochi were disappointing for him. He finished 11th on the normal hill and 7th on the large hill. With the team it was enough for a silver medal.

At the end of the season he finished 6th overall.

2014/15 World Cup
The 2014/15 season was also difficult for Schlierenzauer. After poor performances at the beginning of the season, he managed to win the first competition in Lillehammer, it was his 53 and last World Cup victory. The next weekend he took second place in the first competition at Nizhny Tagil, his 88 and also last world cup podium.

In the Four Hills Tournament he finished 7th. As the season progressed, Schlierenzauer fought for his form and was able to win the silver medal on the large hill event at the Nordic World Ski Championships in Falun, he only had to admit defeat to the German Severin Freund. With the team it was also enough for a silver medal.

The 2014/15 season was Schlierenzauer's last at the top of the world.

2015/16 to 2020/21
After poor performances early in the 2015/16 season, Schlierenauer took a break and returned to the Four Hills Tournament, but failed to impress there either, and ended the season as a result. In March 2016 he tore his cruciate ligament while skiing in Canada and had to postpone his comeback to 2017.

At the Nordic World Ski Championships 2017 in Lahti it was enough for Schlierenzauer to win a bronze medal with the team.

His best result of the season 2017/18 was 13th at Oberstdorf in the Four Hills Tournament. At the season Final in Planica, Schlierenzauer jumped 253.5 meters in the Qualification but touched the ground with his hands. It was the same length as Stefan Kraft's world record, however it did not count as he touched the ground with his hands. Schlierenzauer finished the season 35th overall with 77 points.

At the Winter Olympics in Pyeongchang, he finished 22nd on the normal hill. He was not set up on the large hill and missed a medal as fourth with the team.

Schlierenzauer disappointed in the season 2018/19 opener at Wisla, but was 12th in the difficult wind conditions at Kuusamo, a week later.

The 2019/20 season was his best since 2014/15. Schlierenzauer was able to achieve four top ten results, including a fourth place in Nizhny Tagil. In the end he finished 20th overall.

On 21 September 2021, he announced the end of his athletic career on his website.

Olympic Games

World Championships

Ski Flying World Championships

World Cup

Standings

Individual starts (275)

Wins

Invalid ski jumping world record

 Not recognized. Ground touch at world record distance.

References

External links

 
 
 
 

1990 births
Austrian male ski jumpers
Holmenkollen Ski Festival winners
Living people
Sportspeople from Innsbruck
Ski jumpers at the 2010 Winter Olympics
Ski jumpers at the 2014 Winter Olympics
Ski jumpers at the 2018 Winter Olympics
Olympic ski jumpers of Austria
Olympic bronze medalists for Austria
Olympic gold medalists for Austria
Olympic medalists in ski jumping
FIS Nordic World Ski Championships medalists in ski jumping
Medalists at the 2010 Winter Olympics
Olympic silver medalists for Austria
Medalists at the 2014 Winter Olympics
Holmenkollen medalists
21st-century Austrian people